Doris Jean Lamar-McLemore (April 16, 1927 – August 30, 2016) was an American teacher who was the last native speaker of the Wichita language, a Caddoan language spoken by the Wichita and Affiliated Tribes, indigenous to the U.S. states of Oklahoma and Texas.

Early life
McLemore was born in 1927 in Anadarko, Oklahoma. Her mother was Wichita and her father was European-American. McLemore was raised by her fullblood Wichita maternal grandparents, and Wichita was her first language.

McLemore graduated from Riverside Indian School, an American Indian boarding school, in 1947 and worked as a house mother there for 30 years. She married twice and had a son and two daughters. In 1959 McLemore moved back to live near Gracemont, Oklahoma, to live among her relatives.

Preservation of the Wichita language
In 1962, McLemore met David Rood, a linguist from the University of Colorado, and they collaborated to preserve the Wichita language.

McLemore taught language classes for the Wichita and Affiliated Tribes and before her death, was collaborating with linguist David Rood to create dictionary and language CDs.

"Doris is amazing for being able to retain as much as she does without having anyone to speak it to on a daily basis," said former Wichita tribal chairman, Gary McAdams. She died on August 30, 2016, at the age of 89.

References

External links
Wichita and Affiliated Tribes Language Class, with sample vocabulary
Wichita Language Documentation Project 
Slideshow of Doris Jean Lamar McLemore telling the Wichita creation story in Wichita

1927 births
2016 deaths
Last known speakers of a Native American language
People from Anadarko, Oklahoma
Educators from Oklahoma
Wichita people
21st-century American educators
21st-century American women educators
20th-century Native American women
20th-century Native Americans
21st-century Native American women
21st-century Native Americans
Native American people from Oklahoma